The State of the City Address - or State of the City Speech - is a speech customarily given once each year by the mayors or city managers of many cities in the United States and Canada, and commonly called as State of the City Address (SOCA) or State of the Municipality Address (SOMA) in the Philippines. Other international cities have also adopted the tradition; for example, the Executive Mayor of Johannesburg has delivered a State of the City Address since 2002.  In Corning, New York the "State of the City Address" has been replaced by the "Status of the Administration Address" given by the City Manager who serves as the City's Chief Executive Officer rather than the Mayor. 

The timing, venue and purpose of a State of the City Address can vary significantly depending on local history and practice. Most State of the City Addresses are held early in the calendar year, but some mayors deliver their address as late as December of each year. In many American and Canadian cities, by law or tradition, the State of the City Address is delivered to the city council of the city. Just as often, the presentation is given to - or even given at the invitation of - members of a local business organization or a prominent local charity. Either way, the Address is usually used to outline the mayor's legislative proposals and policy directions for the upcoming year.

The analogous address given by the president of the United States is known as the State of the Union address and the address given by a governor of a U.S. state is known as the State of the State address. The mayor of the District of Columbia gives a State of the District address.

Since Canadian provincial legislatures and the Parliament of Canada begin legislative sessions with a Speech from the Throne delivered on the government's behalf by the Lieutenant Governor or the Governor-General of Canada, there is no formal equivalent for the federal government or regional governments in the Canadian system. However, on occasion, local business organizations have invited their province's Premier to deliver a State of the Province Address.

References

Speeches by type
Local government in the United States
Local government in Canada